Old Allamakee County Courthouse may refer to:
Old Allamakee County Courthouse (Waukon, Iowa), now the Allamakee County Historical Museum
Old Allamakee County Courthouse (Lansing, Iowa)